Luan Patrick Wiedthäuper (born 20 January 2002), known as Luan Patrick, is a Brazilian footballer who plays as a central defender for Red Bull Bragantino, on loan from Athletico Paranaense.

Career statistics

Honours
Athletico Paranaense
Campeonato Paranaense: 2020

References

External links
Athletico official profile 

2002 births
Living people
Sportspeople from Rio Grande do Sul
Brazilian footballers
Association football defenders
Campeonato Brasileiro Série A players
Campeonato Paranaense players
Club Athletico Paranaense players
América Futebol Clube (MG) players
Red Bull Bragantino players
Brazil youth international footballers